Dana Levin (born 1965) is a poet and teaches Creative Writing at Maryville University in St. Louis, where she serves as Distinguished Writer in Residence. She also teaches in the Warren Wilson College MFA Program for Writers. She lives in Saint Louis, Missouri.

Life
She earned degrees from Pitzer College and the Creative Writing Program at New York University.

Her first book, In the Surgical Theatre, was chosen by Louise Gluck for the 1999 American Poetry Review/Honickman First Book Prize (Copper Canyon Press); it went on to receive nearly every award available to first books and emerging poets. Copper Canyon brought out her second book, Wedding Day, in 2005 and her third, Sky Burial, in 2011. In reviewing Sky Burial, The New Yorker called it "utterly her own, and utterly riveting."  the Los Angeles Times says of Levin's work, "Dana Levin's poems are extravagant...her mind keeps making unexpected connections and the poems push beyond convention...they surprise us." Her most recent book is Banana Palace (Copper Canyon Press, 2016).

Awards
 1999 National Endowment for the Arts Grant
 2000 John C. Zacharis First Book Award
 2003 PEN/Joyce Osterweil Award for Poetry, In the Surgical Theatre
 2004 Rona Jaffe Foundation Writers' Award
 2004 Witter Bynner Fellowship from the Library of Congress
 2005 Whiting Award for poetry
 2007 Guggenheim Fellowship in Poetry

Works

Anthologies

References

External links
Dana Levin, poems and bio, Poetry Foundation
Dana Levin at Poets.org

Living people
1965 births
American women poets
New York University faculty
Rona Jaffe Foundation Writers' Award winners
21st-century American poets
American women academics
21st-century American women writers